Santisima Trinidad (meaning Most Holy Trinity in Spanish) may refer to:

Places 
 Santísima Trinidad (fort), a fortress that once existed on the Bio Bio River in Bio Bío province, Chile
 Santísima Trinidad (Asunción), a barrio (district) in Asunción, Paraguay and home of the football club Sportivo Trinidense
 La Santísima Trinidad de Paraná, a former Jesuit mission in Paraguay
 Santisima Trinidad (Taiwan), a Spanish settlement from 1626 to 1642 on the island of Formosa

Ships
 One of several Spanish ships including:
 , a 400-ton galleon, which escaped when Panama City was attacked in 1671 and was later captured by English buccaneers
  – largest of the Manila galleons; officially named Santísima Trinidad y Nuestra Señora del Buen Fin, captured by the British in 1762
 , world's largest warship in its time, until it sank after the Battle of Trafalgar (1805)
 One of several Argentine warships including:
 , a brigantine of the Independence Wars era
 , a Type 42 destroyer in service with the Argentine Navy 1981–1989.

See also
 Buenos Aires, Argentina - its original name in 1560 was Ciudad de la Santísima Trinidad, Puerto de Buenos Aires
 Roman Catholic Archdiocese of Buenos Aires - Santísima Trinidad was an alternative title in the early 20th century
  - page listing all Argentine Navy ships with this name